is a Shinto shrine in Toyota, Aichi Prefecture, Japan. It enshrines the first Shōgun of the Tokugawa Shogunate, Tokugawa Ieyasu.

History
The descendants of Matsudaira Chikauji (d. 1393), the progenitor of the Matsudaira clan, continued to live in  village in what is now the city of Toyota until modern times. In 1619, a clan hatamoto and the 9th generation descendant of Chikauji, enshrined the kami of the recently-deified Tokugawa Ieyasu into a local Hachiman shrine, transforming it into a Tōshō-gū. The shrine is located on a side which claimed to be the location of a well where Ieyasu was bathed as an infant. The site was collectively designated a National Historic Site of Japan in the year 2000, together with 3 other locations relevant to the early history of the Matsudaira clan.

References

External links

Matsudaira hamlet tourist information

See also 
Tōshō-gū
List of Tōshō-gū
List of Historic Sites of Japan (Aichi)

External links 
 

Shinto shrines in Aichi Prefecture
Historic Sites of Japan
Toyota, Aichi
Tōshō-gū